CD121 may refer to:
IL1R1
IL1R2